The Tunisia national women's football team, nicknamed The Eagles of Carthage, is the national team of Tunisia and is controlled by the Tunisian Football Federation. The team competes in the Africa Women Cup of Nations, UNAF Women's Tournament, Arab Women's Championship and the Women's World Cup, which is held every four years.

History

Women's football in Tunisia is now multiplying efforts to assert its national and international reputation. Nevertheless, the road may be long.

The beginning of women's football in Tunisia
During the 2000s, women's football remained non-existent in Tunisia. This discipline practiced in women has indeed suffered from a total neglect of the major players in the sector. This neglect is the result of a culture rooted in male football. Moreover, women have fallen behind in the field. However, Tunisia is full of talent. Fortunately, this mentality has begun to fade after the discovery of exceptionally competent female players.

Today, Tunisia is starting to take off in the field of women's sports. However, the country remains behind other African countries. Indeed, Cameroon, Nigeria and Ivory Coast have already revealed multiple players in this discipline. In addition, the qualification of the women's team for the African Cup of Nations will affirm the potential of women in football.

The world of women's football in Tunisia
The Tunisian women's football cup started the season in 2004–2005. It is a national football competition organized every year. This competition opposes the best women's football clubs in Tunisia. Thus, the cup of Tunisia women's football has revealed several clubs, including the Association Sportive Feminine du Sahel having won 7 titles. This competition has also revealed Tunis Air Club which has won 3 titles.

Then, the third position is awarded to the Higher Institute of Sport and Physical Education of Kef. Moreover, Sana Yaakoubi is among the rare pearls of women's football in Tunisia. The player has managed to win 2 titles during the 2006 and 2008 edition. Moreover, the Sports Association of the Banque de l'Habitat located in Tunis has obtained a title during the competition of 2010. In addition to this annual competition, the state has also organized since 2004 the championship of Tunisia women's football.

Tunisian women's football on the international level
Despite the national competitions, Tunisia remains absent from international confrontations. This is indeed the observation of FIFA. Moreover, Tunisia has never revealed its true potential on the international level, says the federation. FIFA has also qualified Tunisia as inactive since 2016. Indeed, the federation believes that the country is excluded from the list of 140 nations of women's football.

Yet, the Tunisian federation has committed to the establishment of a large women's national team. This initiative aims to create a female model of Tunisian football at the international level and to change the finding of FIFA. This organization, advised by Tarek Bouchamaoui, will be able to see the skills of women's football. Moreover, Tarek Bouchamaoui, a member of the FIFA council, wishes an improvement of all the teams in Africa, including the women's teams.

2022
The Tunisian team qualified for second time to 2022 Women's Africa Cup of Nations after a victory against Equatorial Guinea. In their first match against Togo, Tunisia recorded their first win ever in the WAFCON 4–1. Even with two defeats against Zambia 1–0 and Cameroon 2–0, the team was still able to qualify to the quarter-finals for the first time ever as one of the third ranked teams. But with Tunisia only finished third, it faced a tough task against traditional women's powerhouse South Africa, as the game was also a historic chance for Tunisia to qualify for the 2023 FIFA Women's World Cup for their first-time ever, and could be another potential Arab team to debut after Morocco a day earlier. Against South Africa, Tunisia was unfortunate to lose 1–0 with a grit performance against one of the best teams in Africa. The Tunisians still had another chance with a Repechage match against Senegal to enter the inter-confederation play-offs, yet another lacklustre performance saw Tunisia's dream crashed out, losing 2–4 on penalties.

Team image

Supporters

Kit manufacturer

Home stadium
The Tunisia women's national football team plays their home matches on the Stade Olympique de Radès.the stadium has an all-seater capacity of 60,000. The first match at the stadium was played on 7 July 2001 against between Étoile du Sahel and CS Hammam-Lif for the Tunisian Cup final.CS Hammam-Lif won the match 1–0, with Anis Ben Chouikha scoring the lone goal.
In addition, there are many other venues that host the Tunisian team, such as....

Current team status

2022 Africa Women Cup of Nations

Results and fixtures

The following is a list of match results in the last 12 months, as well as any future matches that have been scheduled.

Legend

2022

2023

Coaching staff

Current coaching staff

Manager history
 Samir Landolsi (2006–2008)
 Mohamed Ali Hami (2008–2012)
 Samir Landolsi (2012–2014)
 Mourad Bacha (2014–2016)
 Samir Landolsi (2016–2018)
 Samir Landolsi (2021–)

Players

Current squad
The following 28 players were named for the International Friendly match against  and 2022 Africa Women Cup of Nations  on 28  June 2022.

Caps and goals accurate up to and including 26 August 2021.

Recent call-ups
The following players have also been called up to the Tunisia squad within the last 12 months.

      

INJ Player withdrew from the squad due to an injury.
PRE Preliminary squad.
SUS Player is serving a suspension.
WD Player withdrew for personal reasons.

Previous squads
Africa Women Cup of Nations

2022 Africa Women Cup of Nations squads
UNAF Women's Tournament
2020 UNAF Women's Tournament squad
Arab Women's Cup
2021 Arab Women's Cup squad

Records

*Active players in bold, statistics correct as of 14 July 2022.

Most capped players

Top goalscorers

Competitive record

 Champions   Runners-up   Third place   Fourth place

*Red border color indicates tournament was held on home soil.

Worldwide

FIFA Women's World Cup

*Draws include knockout matches decided on penalty kicks.

Olympic Games

*Draws include knockout matches decided on penalty kicks.

Continental

Africa Women Cup of Nations

*Draws include knockout matches decided on penalty kicks.

–

African Games

 Tournament open to the national U-20 teams

Regional

UNAF Women's Tournament

Arab Women's Championship

Honours

Regional
UNAF Women's Tournament
Champions (1):  2009
3rd Place (1):  2020
Arab Women's Championship
3rd Place (1):  2006
Runners-up (1): 2021
Menton Tournament
Champions (3):  2010, 2013, 2014
Runners-up (1):  2009

All−time record against FIFA recognized nations
The list shown below shows the Tunisia national football team all−time international record against opposing nations.
*As of 17 July 2022 after match against .
Key

Record per opponent
*As of 17 July 2022  after match against .
Key

The following table shows Sudan's all-time official international record per opponent:

FIFA rankings

Rankings by year 
Below is a chart of Tunisia FIFA ranking from 2008 until now.

See also

Sport in Tunisia
Football in Tunisia
Women's football in Tunisia
Tunisian Football Federation
Tunisia national football team
Tunisia women's national under-20 football team
Tunisia women's national under-17 football team

References

External links
Official website
FIFA profile

َArabic women's national association football teams
 
African women's national association football teams